Oraville may refer to:

Oraville, Illinois, United States
Oraville, Maryland, United States

See also
Orville (disambiguation)
Oroville (disambiguation)
Auroville, experimental community in India